Hail Satanas We Are The Black Legions is the first studio recording by French black metal band Mütiilation. The recording pays a direct homage to The Black Legions, which Mütiilation had recently joined at the time of the EP's release. It was issued as a 7" vinyl EP (33-rpm).

Track listing
 "Desecrate Jesus' Name" (5:31)
 "Remembrance of my Past Battles and Times" (4:25)
 "Black Wind of War" (3:24)

Reissues
The EP was re-released by Nightmare Productions in 2006, with full permission of Meyhna'ch.

Cover art 

The album cover uses an engraving by Claude Gillot (1673 – 1722), depicting several nightmarish creatures.

References

Les Légions Noires albums
Mütiilation albums
1994 EPs